Carline is both a surname and a given name. It is a Dutch and German feminine given name that is a diminutive form of Carla, Carolina and Caroline. It is an English surname derived from Carl. Notable people with the name include:

Surname:
Annie Carline (1862–1945), English painter
George Francis Carline (1855–1920), English painter
Sydney Carline (1888–1929), English artist and teacher
Hilda Carline (1889–1950), English painter
Richard Carline (1896–1980), English artist, arts administrator and writer
Nancy Carline (1909–2004), English painter
Kirsty Carline, New Zealand netball player and coach

Given name:
Carline Bouw (born 1984), Dutch rower
Carline Muir (born 1987), Canadian sprinter
Carline Ray, American jazz instrumentalist and vocalist

See also

Carlina (name)
Carlini (name)
Carlino (name)
Charline (name)
Carlin (name)
Carlyne
Karlin (surname)
Charlin (disambiguation)

Carlina, a thistle genus, common name carline thistle
Carline skipper, a species of butterfly
Carlien Dirkse van den Heuvel

Notes

Patronymic surnames